Ski Cloudcroft is a small ski area located in the village of Cloudcroft in the Sacramento Mountains of Otero County, New Mexico, United States.

History
Ski Cloudcroft was founded in 1963 with a T-bar lift.

Ski Cloudcroft statistics
Due to its southerly location, operation dates are subject to snowfall conditions. Consequently, the area operates only sporadically.

Elevation
Base: 
Summit: 
Vertical Rise:

Developed Terrain
Mountains: 1
Skiable Area: 
Trails: 25 total (32%  beginner, 28%  intermediate, 32%  advanced, 8%  Expert)
Average Snowfall:  annually

Lifts
As of 2021, Ski Cloudcroft has a total of 3 lifts.

1 double chairlift

2 surface lifts
 1 handle tow
 1 rope tow

See also
 List of New Mexico ski resorts
 Sandia Peak Ski Area
 Taos Ski Valley

References

Ski areas and resorts in New Mexico